The 1999 Prokom Polish Open was a women's tennis tournament played on outdoor clay courts in Sopot, Poland that was part of the Tier III  category of the 1999 WTA Tour. It was the second edition of the Prokom Polish Open and took place from 12 July until 18 July 1999. Third-seeded Conchita Martínez won the singles title and earned $27,000 first-prize money.

Entrants

Seeds

Other entrants
The following players received wildcards into the singles main draw:
  Aleksandra Olsza
  Anna Bieleń-Żarska
  Magdalena Grzybowska

The following players received wildcards into the doubles main draw:
  Magdalena Grzybowska /  Amélie Cocheteux

The following players received entry from the singles qualifying draw:

  Eva Bes
  Ľudmila Cervanová
  Sandra Naćuk
  Jelena Kostanić

The following players received entry from the doubles qualifying draw:

  Gala León García /  María Sánchez Lorenzo

Finals

Singles

 Conchita Martínez defeated  Karina Habšudová, 6–1, 6–1
It was Martínez's 31st singles career title and her only in 1999.

Doubles

 Laura Montalvo /  Paola Suárez defeated  Gala León García /  María Sánchez Lorenzo, 6–4, 6–3

References

External links
 ITF tournament edition details
 Tournament draws

1999 WTA Tour
1999 in Polish tennis
Orange Warsaw Open
July 1999 sports events in Europe